Marcus Julius Agrippa is the name of two romanized client kings of Judea in the 1st century:

Agrippa I (Herod Agrippa, ruled 41-44) and his son
Agrippa II (ruled 48-100)